Thorell may refer to various people

Tamerlan Thorell (1830–1901), Swedish arachnologist
Hildegard Katarina Thorell (1850–1930), Swedish portrait painter
Olle Thorell (born 1967), Swedish politician
Olof Thorell (1909–1992), Swedish linguist
Sven Thorell (1888–1974), Swedish boat constructor, winner of Olympic gold medal in sailing in Amsterdam 1928